Artist of the Year is a television competition shown on the Sky Arts channel (formerly known as Artsworld and Sky Arts 1) which aims to find the best portrait and landscape painter every year.

Overview
Through several rounds of regional competitions in different parts of the UK professional and amateur artists are challenged to produce a landscape; whilst the portrait competition takes place in London where the contestants produce a picture of one of three famous sitters. The winning artist of each round, selected by three judges, advances to the semifinal and then to the final. The landscape competition is filmed on location; whilst the heats of the portrait contest are held at Battersea Arts Centre with the final at the National Portrait Gallery. The winner of both series receives a £10,000 commission to paint either a famous landmark or a famous personality and the picture becomes part of a national collection.

The show is produced by London and Glasgow-based independent production company Storyvault Films. It is presented by Joan Bakewell and Stephen Mangan. Series 1 to 5 were presented by Frank Skinner. The judges are the British art historian, curator and arts broadcaster Kate Bryan, head of contemporary art at the Fine Art Society, Kathleen Soriano, director of exhibitions at the Royal Academy, and portrait/landscape painter Tai-Shan Schierenberg.

Transmissions

International adaptations
Landscape Artist of the Year Canada, a Canadian version of the show, premiered in 2020 on Makeful.

References

External links

2013 British television series debuts
2010s British reality television series
2020s British reality television series
Sky UK original programming
Television series about art
English-language television shows